Hole in My Heart may refer to:

"Hole in My Heart" (Alphabeat song), 2010
"Hole in My Heart" (Blackhawk song), 1997
"Hole in My Heart" (Luke Friend song), 2015
"Hole in My Heart (All the Way to China)", a song by Cyndi Lauper, 1988
"Hole in My Heart", a song by Sleeping with Sirens from Gossip, 2017
A Hole in My Heart, a 2004 Swedish drama film